The R322 road is a regional road in central County Mayo in Ireland. The road passes just to the north of Cloonfallagh about halfway between the N17 and Kiltimagh.

The government legislation that defines the R322, the Roads Act 1993 (Classification of Regional Roads) Order 2012 (Statutory Instrument 54 of 2012), provides the following official description:

Kiltimagh – Kilkelly, County Mayo

Between its junction with R320 at Main Street Kiltimagh and its junction with N17 at Cloonturk via James Street at Kiltimagh; Canbrack and Woodfield all in the county of Mayo.

See also
List of roads of County Mayo
National primary road
National secondary road
Regional road
Roads in Ireland

References

Regional roads in the Republic of Ireland
Roads in County Mayo